Dragon Hoops is a nonfiction graphic novel by Gene Luen Yang, illustrated by Gene Luen Yang and Lark Pien, and published by March 17, 2020, by First Second.

Plot
Gene Luen Yang talked about sports that he is not interested when he was a kid. He interests about comic books that he would create comic stories after the graduation. On 2013, Yang published the graphic novel Boxers & Saints. His family celebrates for the latest book, and they would go for to eat. But, Yang quickly starts running out of ideas for the next graphic novel. Yang should be thinking about basketball for their inspirations from high school basketball team Bishop O'Dowd Dragons from Oakland. Yang discovers a coach named Lou Ritchie from the men's basketball team, and didn't quite know each other. He would go to see Ritchie at the campus of Bishop O'Dowd High School and starts conversate about Ritchie when he was in high school as a student.

Reception 
Dragon Hoops received starred reviews from Publishers Weekly, School Library Journal, The Horn Book, Bulletin of the Center for Children's Books, and Booklist, as well as positive reviews from Kirkus, San Francisco Chronicle, and The New York Times.

Publishers Weekly complimented the book's writing: "Using a candid narrative and signature illustrations that effectively and dynamically bring the fast-paced games to life, Yang has crafted a triumphant, telescopic graphic memoir that explores the effects of legacy and the power of taking a single first step, no matter the outcome." The Horn Book's Eric Carpenter drew attention to how "Yang skillfully juggles the stories of multiple players and coaches as well as his own journey from basketball novice to avid fan."

Jesse Karp, writing for Booklist, applauded Yang's artwork: "Combining visual flair, like speeding backgrounds, with nearly diagrammatic movement, he creates pulse-pounding game sequences." Karp continued, noting, "Most important, through recurring visual motifs that connect a champion basketball player to a self-questioning artist to a Russian immigrant with a new idea, he illuminates the risks that every one of us must take and has, once again, produced a work of resounding humanity."

In varied reviews, the book was called a "standout showing," "[a] winner," and "emotional."

The New York Times, The Washington Post, Amazon, Forbes, School Library Journal, Booklist, The Horn Book, Bulletin of the Center for Children's Books, and Publishers Weekly included Dragon Hoops in "Best of" lists. School Library Journal included it several reading lists.

References 

2020 non-fiction books
2020 graphic novels
First Second Books books
Basketball books
2020 children's books